Louis Kerly (1872–1936) was a French stage and film actor.

Selected filmography
 In Old Alsace (1920)
 The Bread Peddler (1923)
 The Two Boys (1924)
 Monte Carlo (1925)
 The Divine Voyage (1929)
 The Devil's Holiday (1931)
 Black and White (1931)
 Bouboule's Gang (1931)
 Les Misérables (1934)
 The New Testament (1936)
 Let's Make a Dream (1936)

References

Bibliography
 Goble, Alan. The Complete Index to Literary Sources in Film. Walter de Gruyter, 1999.

External links

1872 births
1936 deaths
French male film actors
French male stage actors
People from Pontoise